Delli-ye Solmavand (also Romanized as Dellī-ye Solmāvand) is a village in Rud Zard Rural District, in the Central District of Bagh-e Malek County, Khuzestan Province, Iran. At the 2006 census, its population was 77, in 22 families.

References 

Populated places in Bagh-e Malek County